The first haircut for a human has special significance in certain cultures and religions.  It can be considered a rite of passage or a milestone.

Indian babies

Hindu babies 

In Hindu tradition, the hair from birth is associated with undesirable traits from past lives. Thus at the time of the shave, the child is freshly shaven to signify freedom from the past and moving into the future. It is also said that the shaving of the hair stimulates proper growth of the brain and nerves, and that the sikha, a tuft at the crown of the head, protects the memory.

Hindus practice a variety of rituals from birth to death. Collectively these are known as saṃskāras, meaning rites of purification, and are believed to make the body pure and fit for worship.  A boy's first haircut, known as choula, is one such samskara and is considered an event of great auspiciousness. The lawbooks or smritis prescribe that a boy must have his haircut in his first or third year.  While complete tonsure is common, some Hindus prefer to leave some hair on the head, distinguishing this rite from the inauspicious tonsure that occurs upon the death of a parent. Those that practice complete tonsure generally ritually offer the hair to their family deity. Many travel to temples such as the famed Tirumala Venkateswara Temple of Lord Vishnu to perform this ceremony.

Maliku babies 
At the twentieth day from birth, Maliku babies' heads are shaven and the hair is weighed against gold or silver, which is given to the poor.  The ceremony is called boabeylun.

Mongolian babies 
Mongolian children get their first haircut in early ages between 2–5. Depending on the lunar calendar, boys receive their first hair cut in their odd year and girls in even year. The ritual of cutting the first hair is called Sevleg Urgeeh or Daahi Urgeeh. It is a big occasion for a whole family when guests are invited. Each guest cuts a strand of hair, saying their best wishes to the child, and gives a gift and money.

Orthodox Jews

Orthodox boys 

Many Orthodox and Hasidic Jewish boys get their first haircut when they are three years old. The hair-cutting ceremony is known in Yiddish as the upsherenish or upsherin ("shear off"), and in Hebrew as halaqah (from the Arabic حلاقة - "to shave").

In Israel, there are also non-religious families who adhere to this custom and do not cut their sons' hair until the age of three. A mass hair cutting ceremony is held on the holiday of Lag BaOmer at the tomb of Rabbi Simeon bar Yohai in the Galilean town of Meron.

Muslim babies 

The Aqiqah ceremony involves shaving the child's head seven days after birth and anointing the child's head with saffron.  It is traditional to give in charity gold or silver equal in weight to the hair.  This does not have to be done by actually weighing the hair; if it is too difficult to do that, it is sufficient to estimate the weight and give paper currency equivalent to the price of that amount of gold or silver.

European culture

Polish 
The ritual first haircut was a pre-Christian pagan-Slavic tradition which survived in Poland well into the 18th century. This first haircut traditionally took place between the ages of 7 and 10, and was conducted by either the boy's father or a stranger, who would thus enter into the boy's family. Before that age the boy's life was connected to his mother and he was treated as a child. The ritual haircut, coupled with the granting of an additional given name (usually the third), marked the boy's coming of age and a transition to the world of men, in which he was to be looked after by his father. The ritual also constituted the father's formal act of recognition of the boy as a son.

Ukrainian 
Ukrainian babies often have their hair cut on their first birthday as part of the ancient Postryzhennya custom.

Polynesian boys 
In Cook Islands tradition, the haircutting ceremony is a rite of passage for young boys. At these large gatherings the boy sits on a chair draped with tīvaevae (quilts). As his hair is cut, members of the community plaster the boy with money or other gifts. The custom serves to maintain reciprocal ties within the extended family and community.

Traditionally, Niuean boys do not cut their hair, which is lovingly cared for by sisters, mothers and fathers. When the boys become teenagers, a ceremony is held where women tend the hair for the last time before it is cut. Members of the extended family plaster the youth with banknotes – all part of a large informal Niuean economy that links families and ensures the community looks after its own.

Malaysian Babies 
Main Article: Cukur Jambul (Note: This article is not in English and requires a translation)

Malaysian children get their first haircut after the mother's confinement period is over, this can be from around 40–44 days long but more recently it has been done in as few as 20 days. After this period is over it is common to invite extended family over for the ceremony of cutting the child's hair. This ceremony is called Cukur Jambul. The purpose of Cukur Jambul is to welcome the new baby into the clan, it also serves the secondary purpose of allowing extended family to renew their relations with each other. After Cukur Jambul has started with a reading from the Quran, the father or mother takes the child to everyone who will cut some of the baby's hair, these people usually include grandparents, members of the marhaban group, local elders, and religious leaders. It is customary for those who do the cutting to gift the baby with something small, like a little cash. The hair is often weighed in order to donate its weight in gold, or the more convenient equivalent, to the poor. It is later put into some sort of bowl and buried in front of close family members in order to finish the ceremony.

North American babies

Native American babies 
Some Native American tribes commemorated the first haircut with a ritualistic dance.  The Apache tribe had a springtime ritual.

African Caribbean boys 
Within the African Caribbean community this is performed once the child begins to speak clearly or after the child reaches two. This is usually done in a barbershop or carried out by the parent.

Yazidi boys 
In the Yazidi tradition (mainly in Iran), the bisk ceremony involves cutting of a baby boy's two or three first locks, according to old traditions by his 40th day after birth to be given to the family's shaikh and pir, but in modern practice at 7 to 11 months, and kept by the family. The bisk ceremony is regarded as the central initiatory ritual by most Yazidis from Turkey, Armenia. and Syria. In the European Diaspora, the term is often translated as baptism. The ceremony is reminiscent of the Muslim 'aqiqa celebrated on the seventh day after birth, but the Yazidi ceremony takes place at a later stage, when the child has already been named.

See also 
Tonsure, traditional practice of Christian churches of cutting or shaving the hair from the scalp (while leaving some parts uncut) of clerics, monastics, and, in the Eastern Orthodox Church, all baptized members.

References

External links 
The First Haircut
Family Celebrations at Heart  of Many Chinese Traditions

Ceremonies
Hairdressing
Rites of passage